The 2015 Saskatchewan Roughriders season was the 58th season for the team in the Canadian Football League. The Roughriders finished with a 3-15 record and failed to qualify for the playoffs. For the third consecutive season, the club held their training camp at Griffiths Stadium in Saskatoon with the main camp beginning on May 31. On 30 August 2015, with their ninth straight loss and a record of 0 wins and 9 losses, the Roughriders achieved the third-worst start to a season in club history. On October 9, 2015, following a loss to the Hamilton Tiger-Cats, the Roughriders were officially eliminated from post-season contention.

Offseason

CFL draft
The 2015 CFL Draft took place on May 12, 2015. The Roughriders had seven selections in the seven-round draft, including the acquisition of an additional sixth-round pick for Dwight Anderson and the loss of their second-round pick after trading for Cory Watson.

Preseason
On June 14, 2013, it was announced that the Edmonton Eskimos would host their 2015 preseason game at the new SMS Equipment Stadium at Shell Place in Fort McMurray against the Roughriders on June 13, 2015. As part of the deal, the game was broadcast nationally on TSN. The game was played here due to scheduling conflicts with the 2015 FIFA Women's World Cup at Commonwealth Stadium and to broaden the Eskimos' fanbase.

Regular season

Season standings

Schedule

Team

Roster

Coaching staff
On September 1, the team fired the General Manager, Brendan Taman, and the head coach, Corey Chamblin, following an 0-9 start to the season.

References

Saskatchewan Roughriders seasons
2015 Canadian Football League season by team